Antonio Cinelli (born 8 December 1989) is an Italian professional footballer who plays as a midfielder for  club Catanzaro.

Career

Lazio
Born in Rome, capital of Lazio region (and Italy), Cinelli started his career at S.S. Lazio. He was sold to Sassuolo in a co-ownership deal in 2010 for €200,000, on a three-year contract. In June 2012 Lazio bought back the 50% registration rights of Cinelli for €30,000 fee, on a one-year contract.

Vicenza
Cinelli was signed by Serie B club Vicenza on 7 January 2013 on a free transfer.

On 8 June 2015 Cinelli signed a new one-year contract with Vicenza. However, on 19 January 2016 Cinelli was transferred to Cagliari, for €100,000 transfer fee.

Chievo
On 19 July 2016 he was signed by Serie A club Chievo, on a three-year contract. His spell with Chievo was short-lived, which on 8 August he was transferred to Cesena on loan, with an obligation to buy; according to Chievo, the loan fee was €180,000.

On 31 January 2017 Cinelli left for Novara on a temporary basis. Cesena and Chievo also canceled the obligation to buy.

On 24 August 2017, Cinelli left for Serie B newcomers Cremonese on another loan.

He was released from his Chievo contract by mutual consent on 6 November 2018.

Return to Vicenza
On 3 January 2019, he signed with Vicenza Virtus.

Catanzaro
On 10 August 2021, he joined Catanzaro on a two-year contract.

References

External links
 
 

1989 births
Living people
Footballers from Rome
Italian footballers
Association football midfielders
Serie B players
Serie C players
S.S. Lazio players
F.C. Lumezzane V.G.Z. A.S.D. players
U.S. Sassuolo Calcio players
F.C. Pavia players
L.R. Vicenza players
Cagliari Calcio players
A.C. ChievoVerona players
A.C. Cesena players
Novara F.C. players
U.S. Cremonese players
U.S. Catanzaro 1929 players